Dayirman was the first Azerbaijani hip hop group, based in Baku and was founded in 1996 by four friends. The word Dayirman means windmill in Azerbaijani language. The group fuses hip-hop with elements of traditional Meykhana poetry.

In 2010 Dayirman produced the video "Justice to Khojaly" with Toni Blackman to commemorate the victims of the Khojaly massacre.

Discography
"Qurd" (2001)

References

External links

Musical groups established in 1996
Musical groups disestablished in 2012
Azerbaijani hip hop groups